The 1975 Virginia Slims of Dallas, also known as the Maureen Connolly Memorial, was a women's tennis tournament played on indoor carpet courts at the Moody Coliseum in Dallas, Texas that was part of the 1975 Virginia Slims World Championship Series. It was the fourth edition of the tournament, held from March 17 through March 23, 1975. Fourth-seeded Virginia Wade won the singles title and earned $15,000 first-prize money.

Finals

Singles
 Virginia Wade defeated  Martina Navratilova 2–6, 7–6(5–3), 4–3 ret.

Doubles
 Françoise Dürr /  Betty Stöve defeated  Julie Anthony /  Mona Schallau 7–6(5–4), 6–2

Prize money

References

Virginia Slims of Dallas
Virginia Slims of Dallas
Virginia Slims of Dallas
Dallas
Dallas
Virginia Slims of Dallas